Copelatus glyphicus is a species of diving beetle. It is part of the genus Copelatus in the subfamily Copelatinae of the family Dytiscidae. It was described by Say in 1823.

Distribution
Copelatus glyphicus is widely distributed throughout the eastern United States and southern Canada, ranging from Newfoundland south to Florida and west to Minnesota and Texas.

Description

References

glyphicus
Beetles described in 1823
Taxa named by Thomas Say